The Dahuashui Dam is an arch dam on the Qingshuihe River near Pingzhai in Kaiyang County of Guizhou Province, China. The purpose of the dam is hydroelectric power production and flood control. Construction on the dam began in December 2003 and was expected to be complete in May 2007 but a lack of funding delayed project completion until initial operation on January 20, 2008. The dam was constructed with roller-compacted concrete.

See also 

 List of power stations in China

References 

Hydroelectric power stations in Guizhou
Dams in China
Arch dams
Dams completed in 2008
Roller-compacted concrete dams